Elisabeth Kværne (born  August 31, 1953) is a Norwegian musician.  She plays the langeleik, a string instrument similar to the Appalachian dulcimer. She won the 1985 Spellemannprisen in the category folk music and old dance for På langeleik.

References

See also
Music of Norway

1953 births
Norwegian folk musicians
Spellemannprisen winners
Living people
Place of birth missing (living people)